George Henry Williamson (14 January 1866 – 22 June 1929) was an  Australian rules footballer who played with South Melbourne in the Victorian Football League (VFL).

Originally from the Tamar Rowing Club Football Club in Launceston Tasmania, Williamson was named second-best player in Tasmania's first match on Victorian soil against the VFA at the MCG on May 21, 1887, before playing for Williamstown in the 1888-89 seasons (29-33 matches, 2 goals). Following accusations of bribery in a loss to lowly Footscray in 1889, Williamson crossed to the Tricolours for the 1890-91 seasons (30 games, 9 goals) then St Kilda in 1892 (14 games, one goal) and then playing back in Tasmania and at Albert Park Juniors before arriving at South Melbourne in 1895. He then went on to play 29 VFA games and kick one goal with South in 1895-96, captaining the Club in the latter season, the Club's last in the Association before the formation of the VFL, including the 1896 grand final loss to Collingwood. Williamson then played 12 VFL games with South without kicking a goal in 1897-98 before retiring at the age of 32. 

Williamson died on 22 June 1929, at the age of 63 in the Homeopathic Hospital in St Kilda Road, South Melbourne.

Notes

External links 

1866 births
1929 deaths
Australian rules footballers from Tasmania
Sydney Swans players